Persoonia baeckeoides is a species of flowering plant in the family Proteaceae and is endemic to Western Australia. It is an erect, spreading, many-branched shrub with smooth bark, spatula-shaped leaves and greenish yellow flowers arranged singly or in groups of up to three.

Description

Taxonomy and naming
Persoonia baeckeoides was first formally described in 1994 by Peter Weston in the journal Telopea from specimens he collected in Peak Charles National Park.

Distribution and habitat
This persoonia has only been collected from two locations in Peak Charles National Park where it grows on undulating plains.

Conservation status
Persoonia baeckeoides is classified as "Priority One" by the Government of Western Australia Department of Parks and Wildlife, meaning that it is known from only one or a few locations which are potentially at risk.

References

baeckeoides
Flora of Western Australia
Plants described in 1994
Taxa named by Peter H. Weston